The following outline is provided as an overview of and topical guide to Israel:

Israel – country in the Middle East, on the southeastern shore of the Mediterranean Sea and the northern shore of the Red Sea. The State of Israel (Medinat Yisrael) came into existence as the homeland for the Jewish people at the termination of Mandatory British Palestine on 14 May 1948, through the Israeli Declaration of Independence.
This was followed by massive migration of Jews from both Europe and the Muslim countries to Israel, and of Arabs from Israel, contributing to the extensive and still ongoing Arab–Israeli conflict.
Israel's financial capital and technology center is Tel Aviv and the proclaimed capital is Jerusalem, although the state's sovereignty over the city of Jerusalem is internationally unrecognized.  About 43% of the world's Jews live in Israel today, the largest Jewish community in the world.

General reference 
 Pronunciation: 
 Common English country name: Israel
 Official English country name: The State of Israel
 Common endonym(s): Hebrew: יִשְׂרָאֵל (formal ; colloquial ); Arabic: إسْرائيلُ
 Official endonym(s): Hebrew: מְדִינַת יִשְׂרָאֵל (formal ; colloquial ); Arabic: دَوْلَةُ إسْرائيلَ
 Adjectival(s): Israeli 
 Etymology: Name of Israel
 International rankings of Israel
 151st largest country
 96th most populous country
 ISO country codes: IL, ISR, 376
 ISO region codes: See ISO 3166-2:IL
 Internet country code top-level domain:  .il

Geography of Israel 

Geography of Israel
 Israel is: a country
 Location:
 Northern Hemisphere and Eastern Hemisphere
 Eurasia
 Asia
 Southwest Asia
 Middle East
 The Levant
 Extreme points of Israel
 High:  Har Meron 
 Low:  Dead Sea  – lowest point on the surface of the Earth
 Time zone:  Israel Standard Time (UTC+02), Israel Summer Time (UTC+03)
 Population of Israel: (May 2008) Total: 7,282,000 people - 96th most populous country
 Area of Israel:   (Including the Golan Heights and East Jerusalem) - 151st largest country
 Atlas of Israel

Environment of Israel 

 Climate of Israel
 Ecology of Israel
 Ecoregions in Israel
 Renewable energy in Israel
 Geology of Israel
 Green building in Israel
 National parks of Israel
 Protected areas of Israel
 Wildlife of Israel
 Flora of Israel
 Fauna of Israel
 Birds of Israel
 Mammals of Israel
 Zalul Environmental Association

Natural geographic features of Israel 
 Lakes of Israel
 Rivers of Israel
 World Heritage Sites in Israel

Regions of Israel

Ecoregions of Israel

Administrative divisions of Israel 

Administrative divisions of Israel
 Districts of Israel (6)
 Subdistricts of Israel (15)
 Natural regions of Israel (50)
 Municipalities of Israel

Districts of Israel 

Districts of Israel

Subdistricts of Israel

Natural regions of Israel

Municipalities of Israel 

 Cities of Israel
 Capital of Israel: Jerusalem and largest city in area and population.
 Tel Aviv - Israel's commercial center.
 Haifa - largest city of northern Israel and a major seaport.
 Beersheba - largest city of southern Israel.
 Eilat - Israel's southernmost city and only port on the Red Sea.
 local councils
 regional councils

Demography of Israel 

Demographics of Israel

Government and politics of Israel 

Politics of Israel
 Form of government: parliamentary representative democratic republic
 Capital of Israel: Jerusalem
 Elections in Israel
 
 Political parties in Israel
 Political scandals of Israel
 Taxation in Israel

Branches of the government of Israel

Executive branch of the government of Israel 
 Head of state: President of Israel, Isaac Herzog
 Head of government: Prime Minister of Israel, Naftali Bennett
 Governments of Israel

Legislative branch of the government of Israel 

 Knesset (unicameral parliament): Lists of Knesset members

Judicial branch of the government of Israel 

Israeli judicial system
 The Supreme Court of Israel serves as an appellate court, High Court of Justice and constitutional court
 District Courts serve as appellate courts and also serve as courts of first instance for some cases
 Magistrate Courts serve as the court of first instance; some magistrate courts deal with specific affairs
 Separate systems, which include religious courts, military courts, labor courts

Foreign relations of Israel 

Foreign relations of Israel
 Arab–Israeli conflict
 Six-Day War
 Yom-Kippur War
 Israeli–Palestinian peace process
 Arab-Israeli peace projects
 Israeli settlement
 United Nations Security Council Resolution 2334
 Diplomatic missions in Israel
 Diplomatic missions of Israel
 Israel–United States relations

International organization membership 

International organization membership of Israel
Israel is a member of:

Bank for International Settlements (BIS)
Black Sea Economic Cooperation Zone (BSEC) (observer)
European Bank for Reconstruction and Development (EBRD)
European Organization for Nuclear Research (CERN) (observer)
Food and Agriculture Organization (FAO)
Inter-American Development Bank (IADB)
International Atomic Energy Agency (IAEA)
International Bank for Reconstruction and Development (IBRD)
International Chamber of Commerce (ICC)
International Civil Aviation Organization (ICAO)
International Criminal Court (ICCt) (signatory)
International Criminal Police Organization (Interpol)
International Development Association (IDA)
International Federation of Red Cross and Red Crescent Societies (IFRCS)
International Finance Corporation (IFC)
International Fund for Agricultural Development (IFAD)
International Labour Organization (ILO)
International Maritime Organization (IMO)
International Mobile Satellite Organization (IMSO)
International Monetary Fund (IMF)
International Olympic Committee (IOC)
International Organization for Migration (IOM)
International Organization for Standardization (ISO)
International Red Cross and Red Crescent Movement (ICRM)

International Telecommunication Union (ITU)
International Telecommunications Satellite Organization (ITSO)
International Trade Union Confederation (ITUC)
Inter-Parliamentary Union (IPU)
Multilateral Investment Guarantee Agency (MIGA)
Organisation for Economic Co-operation and Development (OECD)
Organization for Security and Cooperation in Europe (OSCE) (partner)
Organisation for the Prohibition of Chemical Weapons (OPCW) (signatory)
Organization of American States (OAS) (observer)
Permanent Court of Arbitration (PCA)
Southeast European Cooperative Initiative (SECI) (observer)
United Nations (UN)
United Nations Conference on Trade and Development (UNCTAD)
United Nations Educational, Scientific, and Cultural Organization (UNESCO)
United Nations High Commissioner for Refugees (UNHCR)
United Nations Industrial Development Organization (UNIDO)
Universal Postal Union (UPU)
World Customs Organization (WCO)
World Federation of Trade Unions (WFTU)
World Health Organization (WHO)
World Intellectual Property Organization (WIPO)
World Meteorological Organization (WMO)
World Tourism Organization (UNWTO)
World Trade Organization (WTO)
World Veterans Federation

Law and order in Israel 

Law of Israel
 Capital punishment in Israel
 Censorship in Israel
 Constitution of Israel
 Crime in Israel
 Human rights in Israel
 LGBT rights in Israel
 Freedom of religion in Israel
 Law enforcement in Israel

Military of Israel 

Israel Defense Forces
 Command
 Commander-in-chief: Gadi Eizenkot
 Defence minister: Avigdor Liberman
 Ministry of Defense of Israel
 Forces
 Army of Israel
 Navy of Israel
 Air Force of Israel
 Special forces of Israel
 Wars involving Israel
 Military operations conducted by the Israel Defense Forces
 Military history of Israel
 Military ranks of Israel

Local government in Israel 

Local government in Israel

History of Israel 

History of Israel

History of Israel by period

Prehistory of Israel 
 Prehistory of the Levant

Ancient history of Israel 

History of ancient Israel and Judah
 Canaan
 Israelites
 Kingdom of Israel (united monarchy) (hypothetical)
 Kingdom of Israel (Samaria)
 Kingdom of Judah
 Babylonian rule
 Second Temple period
 Persian rule
 Coele-Syria (Hellenistic period)
 Hasmonean dynasty
 Herodian dynasty
Herodian kingdom
Herodian Tetrarchy
 Destruction of the Second Temple
 Roman period
 Roman Judea
 Jewish–Roman wars
 First Jewish–Roman War (66–73 CE)
 Siege of Jerusalem (AD 70)
 Destruction of the Second Temple
 Bar Kokhba revolt (132–136 CE)
 Syria Palaestina

The Jewish "Middle ages" in Palestine
1st Millennium 
 Ancient synagogues in Israel
 Ancient synagogues in Palestine
 development of most of early Rabbinic literature, from the era of Chazal
 Mishnah, Tosefta, and Minor tractates
 Halakhic Midrash, and most of the Aggadic Midrashim
 Palestinian Talmud
 4th century - Jewish revolt against Constantius Gallus
 7th century - Jewish revolt against Heraclius
 Piyyut
 Jose ben Jose, Yanai (Payetan)
  6th - 10th centuries- the Palestinian Masoretes
 Niqqud, Hebrew cantillation (trope).
 2nd millennium
 Pre-Modern Aliyah
 Chronology of Aliyah in modern times
 Old Yishuv

Mandatory Palestine 

Mandatory Palestine
 Mandate for Palestine
 United Nations Partition Plan for Palestine
 History of the Israeli–Palestinian conflict

History of modern Israel 

Timeline of Israeli history
 History of the Israeli–Palestinian conflict
 Israeli Declaration of Independence
 1948 Arab–Israeli War
 Austerity in Israel
 Reparations Agreement between Israel and West Germany (1952)
 Six-Day War (1967)
 Yom Kippur War (1973)
 Israeli disengagement from Gaza (2005)
 Current events of Israel

Years in Israel

History of Israel by region 

 History of Jerusalem (timeline)
 History of Tel Aviv (timeline)

History of Israel by subject 

 Economic history of Israel
 Start-up Nation
 Jewish history
 History of the Jews and Judaism in the Land of Israel
 Jewish refugees
 Military history of Israel
 History of the Israel Defense Forces
 Arab–Israeli conflict
 History of the Israeli–Palestinian conflict
 Postage stamps and postal history of Israel

Culture of Israel 

Culture of Israel
 Architecture of Israel
 Cuisine of Israel
 Ethnic minorities in Israel
 Festivals in Israel
 Humor in Israel
 Languages of Israel
 Media of Israel
 National symbols of Israel
 Coat of arms of Israel
 Flag of Israel
 National anthem of Israel
 People of Israel
 Prostitution in Israel
 Public holidays in Israel
 Records of Israel
 Religion in Israel
 Buddhism in Israel
 Christianity in Israel
 Hinduism in Israel
 Islam in Israel
 Ahmadiyya in Israel
 Judaism in Israel
 Sikhism in Israel
 World Heritage Sites in Israel
 List of synagogues in Israel

Art in Israel 
 Art in Israel
 Cinema of Israel
 Literature of Israel
 Music of Israel
 Television in Israel
 Theatre in Israel

Sports in Israel 

Sports in Israel
 Football in Israel

Economy and infrastructure of Israel 

Economy of Israel
 Economic rank, by nominal GDP
 Agriculture in Israel
 Banking in Israel
 National Bank of Israel
 Communications in Israel
 Internet in Israel
 Companies of Israel
Currency of Israel: New Sheqel
ISO 4217: ILS
 Economic history of Israel
 Start-up Nation
 Energy in Israel
 Energy policy of Israel
 Oil industry in Israel
 Health care in Israel
 Mining in Israel
 Science and technology in Israel
 Tourism in Israel
 Transport in Israel
 Israel Stock Exchange
 Transportation in Israel
 Airports in Israel
 Rail transport in Israel
 Roads in Israel
 Water supply and sanitation in Israel

Education in Israel 

Education in Israel

See also 

Israel
Index of Israel-related articles
List of international rankings
Member state of the United Nations
Outline of Asia
Outline of geography

References

External links

 Government
 (Hebrew) Israel Government Portal (with links to English, Arabic versions)
 (Hebrew) Prime Minister's Office, official site (with links to English, Arabic versions)
 (Hebrew) President of the State of Israel, official site (with links to English, Arabic versions)
 The Knesset, official site of Israel's parliament
 (Hebrew) The Supreme Court, official site (with links to English, Arabic versions)
 Ministry of Foreign Affairs, official site
 (Hebrew) Central Bureau of Statistics, official site (with links to English, Arabic versions)
 Ministry of Tourism, official site
 Ministry of Industry Trade & Labor Official Site
 Ministry of Religion
 Ministry of construction and Housing

 General reference
 Israel. The World Factbook. Central Intelligence Agency.
 Encyclopædia Britannica entry on Israel
 BBC country profile of Israel
 Library of Congress Country Studies entry on Israel
 Columbia University library related to Israel
 hWeb - Israel-Palestine in Maps

Media
 The Jerusalem Post
 Ynet News, based on Tel Aviv
 Israel Broadcasting Authority, state broadcasting network  (with link to English version)
 Israel National News
 Kol Israel Voice of Israel
 HaAretz

 Other
 
  Israel at WikiMapia, Geo Links for Topical outline of Israel
 
 

 
 
Israel